Hengshan District is a district of the city of Jixi, Heilongjiang province, People's Republic of China.

Administrative divisions 
Hengshan District is divided into 7 subdistricts and 2 townships. 
7 subdistricts
 Huamulin, Dahengshan, Xiaohengshan, Erdaohezi, Zhangxin, Fendou, Liumao
2 townships
 Hongqi, Liumao

Notes and references 

Hengshan